A number of natural lakes throughout the world are drying or completely dry due to irrigation or urban use diverting inflow.

See also
 Lists of lakes

References

Drying
Articles containing video clips
Shrunken lakes